This is a list of current and former bands of Sumerian Records, an American independent record label specializing in heavy-metal music.  The company is based in Washington, D.C.; and Los Angeles, California.

Roster

Current 

 After the Burial
 Alexis Munroe
 Animals as Leaders
 Bad Omens
 Between the Buried and Me
 Bones UK
 Black Veil Brides
 Borgore (North America only)
 Born of Osiris
 CHON
 ††† (Crosses)
 Dead Posey
 Drag Me Out
 DRÆMINGS
 Evan Brewer
 The Francesco Artusato Project
 The Faceless
 The HAARP Machine
 I See Stars
 The Kindred
 Lesser Key
 Mestís
 Native Howl 
 Night Riots 
 Nita Strauss
 Oceano
 Palaye Royale
 Poppy
 September Mourning
 Slaughter to Prevail
 Sleeping With Sirens
 Smashing Pumpkins
 Starbenders
 Through Fire
 T.R.A.M.
 Veil of Maya
 Weathers

Former 

 ABACABB (disbanded 2010)
 Agraceful (disbanded 2010)
 Asking Alexandria (active; on Better Noise Records)
 Betraying The Martyrs (active; on Out of Line Music) 
 Bizzy Bone (active)
 Blackguard (active; on Nuclear Blast and Victory Records)
 Body Count (active; on Century Media Records)
 Broadcast the Nightmare (disbanded 2009; unsigned)
 Circle of Contempt (active; unsigned)
 City in the Sea
 Conducting from the Grave (disbanded 2016) 
 Dayshell
 Dead Letter Circus (North America only)
 The Dillinger Escape Plan
 Enfold Darkness (active; on The Artisan Era)
 ERRA (active; on UNFD)
 Fellsilent (disbanded 2010)
 Fever Dreamer 
 I, the Breather
 Lower Than Atlantis (disbanded May 2019)
 Make Me Famous (disbanded 2012)
 Miss Fortune (Active, Unsigned)
 Periphery (active; on 3 Dot Recordings)
 Sea of Treachery (active; unsigned)
 Soreption (active; on Unique Leader Records) 
 Stick to Your Guns (active; on Pure Noise Records)
 Stray From The Path (active; on UNFD)
 Structures (indefinite hiatus)
 Upon A Burning Body (active; on Seek and Strike Records)

Sphinx City Records 

 Bizzy Bone

See also

 List of record labels
 Music of the United States

References

Sumerian Records